Proofs from THE BOOK is a book of mathematical proofs by Martin Aigner and Günter M. Ziegler. The book is dedicated to the mathematician Paul Erdős, who often referred to "The Book" in which God keeps the most elegant proof of each mathematical theorem. During a lecture in 1985, Erdős said, "You don't have to believe in God, but you should believe in The Book."

Content
Proofs from THE BOOK contains 32 sections (45 in the sixth edition), each devoted to one theorem but often containing multiple proofs and related results. It spans a broad range of mathematical fields: number theory, geometry, analysis, combinatorics and graph theory. Erdős himself made many suggestions for the book, but died before its publication. It has gone through six editions in English, and has been translated into Persian, French, German, Hungarian, Italian, Japanese, Chinese, Polish, Portuguese, Korean, Turkish, Russian and Spanish.

In November 2017 the American Mathematical Society announced the 2018 Leroy P. Steele Prize for Mathematical Exposition to be awarded to Aigner and Ziegler for this book.

The proofs include:
 Six proofs of the infinitude of the primes, including Euclid's and Furstenberg's
 Proof of Bertrand's postulate
 Fermat's theorem on sums of two squares
 Two proofs of the Law of quadratic reciprocity
 Proof of Wedderburn's little theorem asserting that every finite division ring is a field
 Four proofs of the Basel problem
 Proof that e is irrational (also showing the irrationality of certain related numbers)
 Hilbert's third problem
 Sylvester–Gallai theorem and De Bruijn–Erdős theorem
 Cauchy's theorem
 Borsuk's conjecture
 Schröder–Bernstein theorem
 Wetzel's problem on families of analytic functions with few distinct values
 The fundamental theorem of algebra
 Monsky's theorem (4th edition)
 Van der Waerden's conjecture
 Littlewood–Offord lemma
 Buffon's needle problem
 Sperner's theorem, Erdős–Ko–Rado theorem and Hall's theorem
 Lindström–Gessel–Viennot lemma and the Cauchy–Binet formula
 Four proofs of Cayley's formula
 Kakeya sets in vector spaces over finite fields 
 Bregman–Minc inequality
 Dinitz problem
 Steve Fisk's proof of the art gallery theorem
 Five proofs of Turán's theorem
 Shannon capacity and Lovász number
 Chromatic number of Kneser graphs
 Friendship theorem
 Some proofs using the probabilistic method

References 

 

Günter M. Ziegler's homepage, including a list of editions and translations.

External links
Proofs from THE BOOK (4th ed.) on the Internet Archive

Mathematical proofs
Mathematics books
Paul Erdős
1998 non-fiction books